The 1973 Atlanta Falcons season was the franchise's eighth year in the National Football League (NFL). The team improved on their previous season's output of 7–7 and achieved their best record until 1980, but failed to reach a maiden playoff berth.

Despite entering the last month of the regular season at 8–3, they were upset by the Buffalo Bills, forcing them into a race with the Washington Redskins for the wild card playoff spot. The NFL's tiebreaker format at the time, which favored teams with the best combined scoring offense and defense, necessitated a blowout win over a Cardinals team that had won only one of its last ten and was playing an unknown quarterback, Gary Keithley. However, while Keithley completed only ten of 32 passes (he and Falcons quarterback Bob Lee recorded a 0.0 passer rating in the game), the Falcons were instead blown out 32–10 at home courtesy of an unexpected Cardinals rushing game and six field goals from Jim Bakken. Although the Falcons won the regular season finale to end the season at 9–5, they lost the wild card tiebreaker to the 10–4 Redskins.

A highlight for the 1973 Falcons was defeating the Vikings when that team was 9–0 and looking at emulating the previous season‘s Dolphins’ perfect season. Despite the Falcons’ success between 2008 and 2012, this was the last time the Falcons defeated the last unbeaten NFL team until they defeated the 14–0 Carolina Panthers in week 16 of the 2015 season.

Personnel

Staff

Roster

Schedule 

Note:  Division opponents in bold text.

Standings

References

External links 
 1973 Atlanta Falcons at Pro-Football-Reference.com

Atlanta Falcons seasons
Atlanta Falcons
Atlanta